Kajsa Vickhoff Lie (born 20 June 1998) is a Norwegian World Cup alpine ski racer, representing the club Bærums SK. She specializes in the speed events of downhill and super-G.

Career
Vickhoff Lie made her World Cup debut at age 18 in January 2017, and has competed in two World Championships, in 2019 and 2021. 

She won gold medals in downhill and Super-G at the Junior World Championships at Davos in 2018.

Vickhoff Lie was airlifted to hospital after suffering a left leg injury during the women's super-G World Cup race at Val di Fassa, Italy on 28 February 2021. She was thrown off the course after catching an edge and landed awkwardly in the safety nets.

In February 2023, she won her first world championships medal, taking bronze in super-G at Méribel, France. Her first World Cup victory came a few weeks later in a downhill at Kvitfjell, Norway.  That victory was the first ever World Cup Downhill win for the Norwegian Women's team.

World Cup results

Season standings

Race podiums
 1 win – (1 DH) 
 3 podiums – (2 DH, 1 SG); 12 top tens

World Championship results

References

External links

 
Norwegian Ski Team – women's alpine, B status

1998 births
Living people
Sportspeople from Bærum
Norwegian female alpine skiers
Alpine skiers at the 2016 Winter Youth Olympics